Jason Newth Morris (born February 3, 1967) is a retired American judoka. He was a four-time Olympian and 2008 Olympic Coach, is best known for winning the silver medal in the -78kg weight category in the 1992 Summer Olympics and a Bronze Medal in the 1993 World Judo Championships. He is a Hachidan (8th Degree Black Belt) his favorite techniques are Uchi Mata, Tai Otoshi, and his "Sticker or Sticky Foot" (AKA Kosotogari).

Achievements
Morris was the Silver Medallist at -78kg in the 1992 Summer Olympics, and was also a Bronze Medalist at the 1993 World Judo Championships. Morris represented the United States in four Olympic Games 1988, 1992, 1996, 2000 & was Team USA Olympic Coach at the 2008 Games.

National honors
2010 – Elected to USJF Hall of Fame
2008 – Named Olympic Coach for 2008 Summer Olympics
2008 – Elected to USA Judo Hall of Fame
2007 USOC "Development Coach of the Year" (Judo)
2006, 2005 & 2003 "Coach of the Year" Real Judo Magazine
2006 USOC "Coach of the Year" (Judo)
2003 "International Jr. Female Coach of the Year" USJF
1998 – Elected to NYAC Hall of Fame
1993 – New York Athletic Club "Athlete of the Year"
1993 & 1992 – USOC "Athlete of the Year" (Judo)
6x National Champion (89, 90, 91, 92, 93 & 99)
8x National Junior Champion
3x Outstanding Judoka of the Year

Gold major international medals
99, 93 & 89 US Open – Colorado Springs, CO
91 Pan Am Games – Havana, Cuba
90 Tbilisi International – Tbilisi, Georgia (Only winner from North & South America)
90 & 89 Guido Sieni – Sassari, Italy
88 Czech Open – Prague, Czech Republic
88 Ontario Open – Toronto, Canada
87 Austrian Open – Leonding, Austria
87 Pacific Rim Championships -Colorado Springs, CO, USA
87 Pan Am Games – Indianapolis, IN, USA
87 & 85 Jr. Pan Am Championships – Mexico City, Mexico
86, 85 & 84 New York Open – Manhattan, NY
85 & 84 Quebec Open – Montreal, QC
81 Mexico International (65kg) -Mexico City, Mexico

Silver major international medals
95 Pan Am Games – Mar de Plata, Argentina
92 Olympic Games – Barcelona, Spain
92 Hungarian Open – Budapest, Hungary
91 Korean Open – Seoul, Korea
90, 87 & 85 US Open – Colorado Springs, CO
89 French Open – Paris, France
89 Pacific Rim Championships -Beijing, China
88 German Open – Russelsheim, Germany

Bronze major international medals
00 British Open – Birmingham, England
99 Rendez Vous Canada – Montreal, QC
95 US Open – Macon, GA
95, 90, 89 & 88 Hungarian Open – Budapest, Hungary
95 Pacific Rim Championships – Sydney, Australia
94, 88 & 86 US Open – Colorado Springs, CO
93 World Championships - Hamilton, Canada
91 Pacific Rim Championships – Honolulu, HI, USA
90 Kano Cup – Tokyo, Japan
90 Tre Torri – Porto Sant'Elpidio, Italy
89 Austrian Open – Leonding, Austria
88 Guido Sieni – Sassari, Italy
86 Jr. World Championships – Rome, Italy
86 Quebec Open – Montreal, QC

5th place in major international events
95 French Open – Paris, France
92 & 90 Czech Open – Prague, Czech Republic
89 World Championships – Belgrade, Yugoslavia
87 World Championships – Essen, Germany

Present
Since retiring from competitive judo after the 2000 Summer Olympics, Morris along with wife Teri own and operate the Jason Morris Judo Center in Glenville, New York

Notable students
Brad Bolen (Pan American Champion)
Nick Kossor (National Champion)
Nicholas Delpopolo (2x Olympian)
Travis Stevens (Coached him to his first Olympics)

See also 
 Judo at the 1992 Summer Olympics
 1993 Canada

References 

 Jason Morris Judo Center Official Website
 Morris's page at Real Judo's "Legends of Judo" site
 USA Judo's press release announcing Morris's selection as coach for the 2008 Olympic team

External links 
 Jason Morris Judo Center Homepage
 databaseOlympics
 Judo Legends

1967 births
Living people
American male judoka
Judoka at the 1988 Summer Olympics
Judoka at the 1992 Summer Olympics
Judoka at the 1996 Summer Olympics
Judoka at the 2000 Summer Olympics
Judoka at the 1991 Pan American Games
Judoka at the 1995 Pan American Games
Olympic judoka of the United States
Olympic silver medalists for the United States in judo
Place of birth missing (living people)
Medalists at the 1992 Summer Olympics
Pan American Games gold medalists for the United States
Pan American Games silver medalists for the United States
Pan American Games medalists in judo
Medalists at the 1991 Pan American Games
20th-century American people